The Nauru Phosphate Royalties Trust (NPRT) was a sovereign wealth fund developed by the government of the Republic of Nauru in which the government invested money from the state-owned mining company, Nauru Phosphate Corporation. This money was then re-invested in a real estate portfolio, among other things, to provide the government with a reliable national income following the depletion of minable phosphates on the island. Although at one time successful, mismanagement and corruption later essentially bankrupted the fund, thus virtually bankrupting the entire Republic.

Responsibility for the Trust rests with the Ministry for the Nauru Phosphate Royalties Trust, a Cabinet position. At present, the office is exercised by the Nauruan Minister of Telecommunications Shadlog Bernicke.

Beginnings
In 1970, the newly independent government of Nauru purchased the mining rights to the island's lucrative phosphate mines from their previous colonial ruler, Australia, for A$21 million.

The mines brought considerable wealth to the tiny island of Nauru, with the industry bringing in around A$100–120 million annually. Annual government expenditures amounted to around A$30 million, thus giving the republic around A$80 million per annum. This surplus was then added to the trust.

The prime years
At the peak of the trust's wealth, the NPRT had investments totalling A$1 billion. These investments included properties in Australia, the Philippines, Guam, and the USA. A partial list of international investments includes:
 Fiji: The Grand Pacific Hotel
 India: Paradeep Phosphate
 New Zealand: Auckland Sheraton Hotel, Roturua Sheraton Hotel
 Philippines: Manila Pacific Star Hotel, Philippines Phosphate & Fertilisers
 Contiguous United States: Pacific House (Washington), Singer Building Development (665 acres - Houston), Hillside Property (600 acres - Oregon)
 Hawaii: Nauru Tower, Hawaiki Tower
 Guam: Pacific Star Hotel
 United Kingdom: 3 Chesham Street (London)
 Samoa: Properties at Vaitele and Sogi
 Australia: Nauru House (Melbourne) -- (this development was known as the "jewel in the crown" of Nauru's overseas properties)

Mismanagement
The great wealth of the tiny Pacific island led it to be nicknamed the "Kuwait of the Pacific". With this great wealth, citizens and government officials flaunted it, as if it were endless(leasing to bad investments such as the notorious Leonardo the Musical: A Portrait of Love) This led to high external representation and excessive official overseas travel (that included golf in the Bahamas) which blew out budgets year after year so that the government began to borrow money to supplement its huge spending. The public service had over 1,500 employees (in a country with a population less than 10,000) and the government ran deficits of A$10 million in the 1990s.

Eventually, more than A$200 million was borrowed. In order to consolidate this debt and pay interest, the government took out a A$240 million loan from General Electrics Capital Division, which was levied against the nation's international real estate portfolio.

Downfall
The virtual end of mining on Nauru paired with running budget deficits made it very difficult for Nauru to pay its debts. International creditors were not receiving payments, then seizing rights to Nauru's entire real estate portfolio, and even seizing the sole aircraft of Air Nauru.

"The paradox"
In 1962, well before Nauru took over the phosphate industry and achieved independence, the United Nations offered a cautious note:

The problem of Nauru presents a paradox. The striking contrast is between a superficially happy state of affairs and an uncertain and indeed alarming future... But this picture of peace and well-being and security is deceptive. Indeed it is a false paradise. For these gentle people are dominated by the knowledge that the present happy state of affairs cannot continue.

Ministers responsible for Nauru Phosphate Royalties Trust

See also
 Phosphate mining in Nauru
 Economy of Nauru
 Nauru Phosphate Corporation
 Republic of Nauru
 Tuvalu Trust Fund

References

Further reading
 United Nations (1962) Visiting Mission to the Trust Territories of Nauru and New Guinea. (New York, U.N.)

External links
Nauru seeks to regain lost fortunes

Sovereign wealth funds
Economy of Nauru
Phosphate mining in Nauru